"One Step Out of Time", written and composed by Paul Davies, Tony Ryan, and Victor Stratton, was the 's entry at the Eurovision Song Contest 1992, performed by Michael Ball.

The song was included on Ball's 1992 self-titled debut album as well as the album Past and Present, which was released on 9 March 2009.

Background

Composition
The song is a mid-tempo ballad, relating the singer's comfort with being "one step out of time" in relation to rejecting the reality around him, instead pining after his former lover. Not accepting that his relationship is over, and spurning the disapproval of his friends, he wishes to put "his love on the line" one more time, imploring his former lover to just let him know what he had done wrong.

Selection process
Reverting to the selection process which decided the entries from 1964 to 1975, a singer was picked internally by the BBC, and the public would vote on which song would go with them to the Eurovision finals. Ball sang eight songs on A Song for Europe 1992, and "One Step Out of Time", performed seventh, emerged as the winner by an overwhelming margin (over 60,000 telephone votes separated the first and second-place finishers).

At Eurovision
At the contest, held in Malmö, the song was performed sixteenth on the night, after 's Tony Wegas with "Zusammen geh'n", and before 's Linda Martin with "Why Me?". At the end of voting that evening, "One Step Out of Time", the pre-contest favourite, took the second-place slot with 139 points. Despite losing by 16 points to "Why Me?", the UK received more 12 point designations than Ireland (four to three). This would be the third of four second-place finishes the UK had placed between 1988 and 1993.

Charts
Before Eurovision, the song debuted and peaked at No. 20 on the UK Singles Chart, and stayed in the chart for seven weeks.

References

External links
 Lyrics from Diggiloo Thrush

1992 singles
Michael Ball songs
Eurovision songs of the United Kingdom
Eurovision songs of 1992
1992 in British music
Polydor Records singles
1992 songs